"Cathy's Clown" is a popular song, written by Don Everly and recorded by The Everly Brothers in 1960. The lyrics describe a man who has been wronged and publicly humiliated by his lover: "Here he comes / That's Cathy's clown". The choruses are sung by brothers Don and Phil in their trademark close harmony style, while Don sings the bridges solo.

"Cathy's Clown" is noted for its unorthodox structure, such as beginning on a chorus and having bridges but no verses. The song was a worldwide success and the best-selling single of the Everly Brothers career. Because of its enduring influence on popular music the song was added to the National Recording Registry of the Library of Congress in 2013.

Recording
The musicians included the Everlys on guitars, Floyd Cramer on piano, Floyd Chance on bass and Buddy Harman on drums.  The distinctive drum sound was achieved by recording them with a tape loop, making it sound as if there were two drummers. "Cathy's Clown" was recorded live in a single take, with Don and Phil sharing a microphone.

History
"Cathy's Clown" was The Everly Brothers' first single for Warner Bros., after they had recorded for Archie Bleyer's Cadence label for three years. It sold eight million copies worldwide, spending five weeks at number 1 on the U.S. Billboard Hot 100 chart and one week on the R&B chart. The song spent seven weeks at number 1 on the UK Singles Chart in May and June 1960, and was the Everly Brothers' biggest-selling single and their third and final U.S. number 1 hit. Billboard ranked it as the number 3 song of the year for 1960.

In 2004, it was ranked 149th on Rolling Stone magazine's list of the 500 Greatest Songs of All Time.

In November 2018, a judge ruled that Don was the sole writer of "Cathy's Clown", as Phil had relinquished his rights sometime before June 1980. Acuff-Rose Music, which owned the song publishing, and BMI (the brothers' rights society) removed Phil's name from all the royalty statements. In 2011, Don filed to regain ownership, with the estate of Phil following in 2014.

Associations
"Cathy's Clown" was inspired by Ferde Grofé's Grand Canyon Suite. It was a major influence on the Beatles, who — having "once toyed with calling themselves The Foreverly Brothers" — three years later copied the Everly's harmonies on their first U.K. No. 1 hit single, "Please Please Me".

"Cathy's Clown" is mentioned in the opening line of Elliott Smith's song "Waltz 2 (XO)", the title track of his 1998 album XO.

Jan and Dean recorded a cover of "Cathy's Clown" for their album Filet of Soul, but Liberty Records rejected both set lists that included the song. Liberty later selected its own set list, which did not include "Cathy's Clown", and released it shortly after Jan Berry's crash near Deadman's Curve. Jan & Dean's cover of "Cathy's Clown" is available on the "Filet Of Soul Redux: The Rejected Master Recordings" release.

Chart history

All-time charts

Reba McEntire version

The song was recorded by American country music artist Reba McEntire in April 1989 as the first single from her album Sweet Sixteen. The song reached #1 on the Billboard Hot Country Singles & Tracks chart.

Chart positions

Year-end charts

Other versions
The song was covered by Bill and Boyd in New Zealand; their version reached number 1 on the Lever Hit Parades chart in that country in July 1960. Another cover, by the English singer Dick Jordon, reached number 5 in New Zealand. A cover of "Cathy's Clown" by Neil Sedaka appears on his 1983 album Come See About Me.
Also covered by Phish at their July 2, 2019 show at Saratoga Performing Arts Center as the show opener.

References

The Everly Brothers songs
Jan and Dean songs
1960 songs
Songs written by Phil Everly
Songs written by Don Everly
1960 singles
Billboard Hot 100 number-one singles
Cashbox number-one singles
Number-one singles in New Zealand
Warner Records singles
Reba McEntire songs
Song recordings produced by Jimmy Bowen
1989 singles
MCA Records singles
United States National Recording Registry recordings